Hot Potatoes: The Best of the Wiggles is a compilation album by the Wiggles which features their greatest hits. The album was released on 7 May 2009. The album includes a track with James Burton on guitar and another track with Paul Hester on drums. Guest vocalists are Rolf Harris, Steve Irwin, Leo Sayer, Kylie Minogue, John Fogerty and Jamie Redfern. The CD version was released in 2009, while the DVD version was originally released in 2010 and re-released in 2014.

Track list
All music by the Wiggles or traditional except listed below.

Personnel
The Wiggles
 Murray Cook
 Jeff Fatt
 Anthony Field
 Greg Page
 Sam Moran

Production
 Anthony Field – producer, musical arrangements
 Dominic Lindsay – musical and string arrangements

Charts

2013 album

Track listing

Credits for `Hot Potatoes! The Best of The Wiggles` CD
The Wiggles: Anthony Field, Lachlan Gillespie, Simon Pryce, Emma Watkins, Murray Cook, Jeff Fatt, Sam Moran, Greg Page

Music Produced By: Anthony Field

String Arrangements By: Dominic Lindsay

Video

The video is a 2010 compilation video, containing some of their best songs. Unlike other songs, the video version of "Ooh It's Captain Feathersword" is sung by Sam Moran since it was from Wiggledancing! Live in Concert.

Songs
 Hot Potato
 Can You (Point Your Fingers and Do the Twist?)
 Fruit Salad
 Rock-a-Bye Your Bear
 Toot Toot, Chugga Chugga, Big Red Car
 Wake Up Jeff!
 Wiggly Party
 Captain Feathersword Fell Asleep on His Pirate Ship (Quack Quack)
 Wiggle Bay
 The Monkey Dance
 Get Ready to Wiggle
 Go Santa Go
 Dorothy (Would You Like to Dance with Me?)
 Ooh It's Captain Feathersword
 Tie Me Kangaroo Down Sport
 Dressing Up
 Move Your Arms Like Henry (featuring Paul Hester on Drums)
 Lights, Camera, Action, Wiggles!
 Do the Owl (featuring Steve Irwin)
 The Zeezap Song
 Play Your Guitar with Murray
 Rockin' Santa (featuring John Fogerty)
 To Have a Tea Party
 Here Come the Chicken (featuring James Burton on Guitar)
 Getting Strong!
 Murray Had a Turtle
 Twinkle, Twinkle Little Star
 I'm Dorothy the Dinosaur!
 You Make Me Feel Like Dancing (featuring Leo Sayer)
 Dr Knickerbocker
 The Shimmie Shake
 Over in the Meadow
 Wags the Dog is Chasing His Tail
 Monkey Man (featuring Kylie Minogue)
 Hot Poppin Popcorn (featuring Jamie Redfern)

2014 video

Hot Potatoes! The Best Of The Wiggles is a 2014 update to the 2010 video of the same name. It is a compilation featuring some of The Wiggles' best songs from every generation.

Song list
 Hot Potato
 Can You (Point Your Fingers And Do The Twist?)
 Do the Propeller!
 Monkey Man (feat. Kylie Minogue)
 Rock-A-Bye Your Bear
 Toot Toot, Chugga Chugga, Big Red Car
 Twinkle, Twinkle Little Star
 You Make Me Feel Like Dancing (featuring Leo Sayer)
 Wake Up Jeff!
 Captain Feathersword Fell Asleep On His Pirate Ship (Quack Quack)
 Ready, Steady, Wiggle!
 Getting Strong!
 Wiggle Bay
 The Monkey Dance
 Everybody, I Have a Question
 Get Ready To Wiggle
 The Shimmie Shake
 Go Santa Go
 Dorothy (Would You Like To Dance With Me?)
 Ooey, Ooey, Ooey Allergies!
 Ooh It's Captain Feathersword
 Dressing Up
 Murray Had A Turtle
 Michael Finnegan
 Move Your Arms Like Henry (featuring Paul Hester on Drums)
 Lights, Camera, Action, Wiggles!
 I'm Dorothy the Dinosaur!
 Simon Says
 Do The Owl (featuring Steve Irwin)
 Play Your Guitar With Murray
 I've Got My Glasses On!
 Hot Poppin Popcorn (featuring Jamie Redfern)
 Rockin' Santa (Featuring John Fogerty)
 Here Come the Chicken (featuring James Burton on Guitar)
 Say the Dance, Do the Dance

Cast

The Wiggles
Anthony Field
Emma Watkins
Lachlan Gillespie
Simon Pryce
Murray Cook
Jeff Fatt
Greg Page
Sam Moran

References

External links

The Wiggles albums
The Wiggles videos
2009 albums
2010 video albums
2013 albums
2014 video albums
Australian children's musical films